Brockhouse may refer to:
Bertram Brockhouse (1918–2003), Canadian physicist
Brøckhouse Brewery, Denmark
Brockhouse Corgi, see Corgi Motorcycle Co Ltd.